Tegiapa is a genus of moths of the family Noctuidae. The genus was described by Nye in 1975.

Species
Tegiapa aarviki Hacker, 2019 Gabon, Uganda, Ethiopia
Tegiapa aberdarensis Hacker, 2019 Kenya
Tegiapa agassizi Hacker, 2019 Ethiopia, Kenya, Tanzania, South Africa
Tegiapa ambiguosa Hacker, Fiebig & Stadie, 2019 Ethiopia
Tegiapa catalai Hacker, 2019 Madagascar
Tegiapa comorana (Viette, 1981) Comoros
Tegiapa craspedica (Hampson, 1910) Ghana, Nigeria, Congo, Equatorial Guinea, Gabon, Angola, Uganda
Tegiapa forsteri Hacker, 2019 Tanzania
Tegiapa goateri Hacker, 2019 South Africa, Swaziland, Zimbabwe
Tegiapa griseaxea Hacker, 2019 Kenya, Uganda
Tegiapa kingstoni Hacker, 2019 Kenya, Uganda, Zimbabwe
Tegiapa larentiodes (Prout, 1922) South Africa, Zaire, Ghana
Tegiapa lenzi Hacker, 2019 Zimbabwe
Tegiapa melanochra Hacker, 2019 São Tomé & Principe
Tegiapa melanoleuca Hacker, 2019 Zambia, South Africa
Tegiapa microplexia (Viette, 1962) Madagascar
Tegiapa nana Hacker, 2019 South Africa
Tegiapa nigrilineata (Hampson, 1916) Somalia
Tegiapa obliqua Hacker, Fiebig & Stadie, 2019 Ethiopia, Kenya
Tegiapa politzari Hacker, 2019 Ethiopia, Kenya, Uganda, Malawi, Rwanda, Tanzania
Tegiapa schreieri Hacker, 2019 Ethiopia, Tanzania, Uganda, Cameroon
Tegiapa steganioides Hacker, Fiebig & Stadie, 2019 Nigeria, Gabon, Ethiopia, Uganda, Tanzania
Tegiapa ugandana Hacker, 2019 Uganda
Tegiapa vanjamanitra (Viette, 1981) Madagascar
Tegiapa virescens (Hampson, 1910) South Africa

References

External links

Acontiinae